Margherita Gioia Masia is an Italian football defender, currently playing for UPC Tavagnacco in Serie A. She has also played for SS Lazio, Torres CF and GS Roma.

She has been a member of the Italian national team, debuting in 2000, and took part in the 2001 and 2005 European Championships.

References

1977 births
Living people
Italian women's footballers
Italy women's international footballers
Serie A (women's football) players
Torres Calcio Femminile players
S.S. Lazio Women 2015 players
People from Sassari
Women's association football defenders
U.P.C. Tavagnacco players
Footballers from Sardinia
Roma Calcio Femminile players